Nationality words link to articles with information on the nation's poetry or literature (for instance, Irish or France).

Events
 Picasso's portrait of Gertrude Stein

Works published in English

Canada
 Jean Blewett, The Cornflower and Other Poems
 Helena Coleman, Songs and Sonnets
 Sophia Almon Hensley, The Heart of a Woman.
 J. D. Logan, Preludes, Sonnets and Other Verses
 Duncan Campbell Scott, Via Borealis, Toronto: William Tyrrell & Co.
 Frederick George Scott, The Hymn of Empire, and Other Poems

United Kingdom
 'Æ' (George William Russell), By Still Waters
 Joseph Campbell, The Rushlight
 John Davidson, Holiday, and Other Poems
 Walter de la Mare, Poems
 C. M. Doughty, The Dawn in Britain
 Thomas Hardy. The Dynasts, II
 Douglas Hyde, editor and translator into English from Gaelic, The Religious Songs of Connacht, Ireland
 Thomas MacDonagh, The Golden Joy, Irish poet published in Ireland
 Harold Monro, Poems
 Alfred Noyes:
 Drake
 "The Highwayman", a ballad
 Marguerite Antonia Radclyffe-Hall, 'Twixt Earth and Stars
 Arthur Symons, The Fool of the World, and Other Poems
 W. B. Yeats, Poems, 1899-1905, Irish poet published in the United Kingdom

United States
 Gelett Burgess, Are You a Bromide?
 William Ellery Leonard, Sonnets and Poems
 Horace L. Traubel, With Walt Whitman in Camden, five volumes, published from this year to 1964

Other in English
 W. F. Alexander and A. E. Currie, editors, New Zealand Verse, anthology
 W. B. Yeats, Poems, 1899-1905, Irish poet published in the United Kingdom

Works published in other languages

France
 Francis Jammes:
 Clairières dans le Ciel
 L'Eglise habillée de feuilles
 Oscar Vladislas de Lubicz-Milosz, also known as O. V. de L. Milosz, Les Sept Solitudes

Other
 José Santos Chocano, Alma América, pról. de Miguel se Unamuno, Peru
 Amelia Denis de Icaza, "Al Cerro Ancón" ("Ancon Hill"), Panama
 Vera Figner, Stikhotvoreniia ("Poems"), Russia
 Alfred Garneau, Poésies, posthumously published; French language; Canada
 Marie Heiberg, Mure-lapse laulud ("Songs of a Problem Child"), Estonia
 Johannes V. Jensen, Digte, Denmark
 Mikhail Kuzmin, Alexandrian Songs, Russia
 Govardhanram N. Tripathi, Kavi Dayramno Aksharadeh, an appraisal of the works of poet Kavi Dayramno Aksharadeh (Indian, writing in Gujarati) (criticism)

Births
Death years link to the corresponding "[year] in poetry" article:
 January 5 – Takashi Matsumoto 松本たかし(died 1956), Japanese Shōwa period professional haiku poet in the Shippo-kai haiku circle, then, starting in 1929, in the Hototogisu group also including Kawabata Bosha; founder of literary magazine, Fue ("Flute") in 1946
 January 6 – Eberhard Wolfgang Möller, (died 1972), German playwright and poet
 January 19 – Robin Hyde (died 1939), New Zealand
 February 22 – Humayun Kabir (died 1969) Bengali poet, educationist, politician, writer and philosopher
 April 13 – Samuel Beckett (died 1989), Irish poet, playwright and novelist, winner of the Nobel Prize in Literature in 1969
 May 10 – Robert Guy Howarth (died 1974), Australian scholar, literary critic and poet
 May 11 – Charles Tory Bruce (died 1971), Canadian writer
 May 17 – Frederic Prokosch (died 1989), American novelist, poet, memoirist and critic
 June 12 – Sandro Penna (died 1977), Italian
 June 22 – Anne Morrow Lindbergh (died 2001), American poet and wife of Charles Lindbergh
 June 27 – Vernon Watkins (died 1967), Welsh poet writing in English
 August 8 – Jesse Stuart (died 1984), American short story writer, poet and novelist
 August 28 – John Betjeman (died 1984), English poet laureate, writer and broadcaster
 September 2 – Ronald Bottrall (died 1989), English
 September 16 – Stanley Burnshaw (died 2005), American poet, critic, novelist, playwright, publisher, editor, translator and scholar
 September 20 – Ishizuka Tomoji 石塚友二 the kanji (Japanese writing) is a pen name of Ishizuka Tomoji, which is written with the different kanji 石塚友次, but in English there is no difference (died 1984), Japanese Shōwa period haiku poet and novelist
 September 27 – William Empson (died 1984), English literary critic and poet
 October 16 – Cleanth Brooks (died 1994) influential American literary critic and professor; author of Understanding Poetry
 November 12 – George Hill Dillon (died 1968), American poet and winner of the 1932 Pulitzer Prize in poetry
 November 23 (November 10 O.S.) – Betti Alver (died 1989), Estonia
 December 23 – Edasseri Govindan Nair (died 1974), Indian, Malayalam-language poet
 Also:
 Ken Barratt, Australian poet and magazine editor
 Mary Finnin, Australian
 James Picot (died 1944), Australian
A. J. Wood, Australian

Deaths
 February 9 – Paul Laurence Dunbar (born 1872), American
 February 27 – Colm de Bhailís (born 1796, sic.), Irish
 March 1 – Lettie S. Bigelow (born 1849), American
 March 31 – James McIntyre (born 1826), Canadian called "the Cheese Poet"
 date not known – Martha Griffith Browne, American abolitionist, novelist and poet

Awards and honors

See also

 20th century in poetry
 20th century in literature
 List of years in poetry
 List of years in literature
 French literature of the 20th century
 Silver Age of Russian Poetry
 Young Poland (Młoda Polska) a modernist period in Polish  arts and literature, roughly from 1890 to 1918
 Poetry

Notes

Poetry
20th-century poetry